Kelly Cherelle Price (born April 4, 1973) is an American R&B and gospel singer. She started her singing career in 1992. Price originally garnered attention by singing backing vocals for Mariah Carey on multiple songs, including her Billboard Hot 100 number one singles: "Fantasy" and "All I Want for Christmas Is You"; before rising to greater prominence after making uncredited guest appearances on the number one single "Mo Money Mo Problems" by The Notorious B.I.G., as well as "Feel So Good" by Mase, which prompted her to release her own music. Her debut album Soul of a Woman (1998), was certified platinum by the Recording Industry Association of America.

The album's lead single "Friend of Mine" reached the top 20 on the Billboard Hot 100 chart. In 1998, Price was featured on the Whitney Houston single "Heartbreak Hotel" alongside Faith Evans, which peaked at number two and earned the trio a nomination for the Grammy Award for Best R&B Performance by a Duo or Group with Vocals. Her second album, Mirror Mirror (2000), and her fourth album Priceless (2003), both reached the top ten on the Billboard 200 chart. In 2016, she made an uncredited appearance on Kanye West's song "Ultralight Beam" from his album The Life of Pablo.

Price has won a Soul Train Music Award, and has received nine Grammy Award nominations.

Life and music career 
Price was born in New York City in Far Rockaway, Queens, and she sang in church as a youngster. Her first professional engagement was with singer George Michael at Madison Square Garden in New York City in January 1992. During rehearsals for the 1992 Grammy Awards the next month, Price was overheard singing in the rehearsal hall by Mariah Carey. Price was later introduced to Carey's then-husband, Sony Columbia's then CEO Tommy Mottola, and was offered a gig as a background singer for Carey, which she did until 1997.

Her second album, Mirror Mirror, was released in 2000 on the Def Soul imprint of Def Jam Records. Island Records and Def Jam Records had merged in 1999, with Price and some other labelmates being reassigned to the Island Def Jam subsidiary Def Soul. Mirror Mirror featured the singles "You Should've Told Me" and the Grammy Award nominated "As We Lay".

In October 2005, Price recorded her first live gospel album. The This Is Who I Am album has been released on October 24, 2006, on her own label, EcclecticSounds Records. It debuted at No. 1 on the Billboard Gospel Charts and peaked at No. 9 on the R&B album chart. Price was inducted as an honorary member of Sigma Gamma Rho sorority in July 2006. In early 2007, Price kicked off a tour with the 'Sisters in the Spirit 2007'.

In 2006, she recorded the song "Why?" for the soundtrack Why Did I Get Married?, the film version of Why Did I Get Married? Priceless Secrets from The Soul of A Woman, in which Price created the role of Sheila alongside Tyler Perry who used the song titles and lyrical content of Price's hit recordings to develop the story. In early 2009, she was featured on Coko's gospel album entitled The Winner in Me on the track "Oh Mary". In June 2010, Price promoted her single "Tired" on The Jazz Joy and Roy syndicated radio show as "some of the best work of my career to date." The song was also featured in Tyler Perry's 2011 film Madea's Big Happy Family. On February 9, 2012, in a pre-Grammy party to celebrate Price's nominations, the singer sang "Jesus Loves Me" with Whitney Houston in what turned out to be Houston's last public performance two days before her death. In September 2009, it was announced she would be joining Deborah Cox and Tamia to form the group The Queen Project. The women seek to empower women of all ages, races, and backgrounds by doing a number of community service projects.

In 2016, Kelly was included in several songs on rapper Kanye West's album, The Life of Pablo. Kelly was a co-writer with American R&B singer K. Michelle, on her single Not a Little Bit which was released on January 22, 2016. It is the lead single from the singer's third studio album, More Issues Than Vogue.

In September 2021, Price was declared missing as reported by TMZ. Her attorney later stated she was privately recuperating from a severe covid infection.

Legal issues 
On July 16, 2010, a lawsuit was filed in a Texas federal court by Price against a nationally known prosperity ministry, New Light Church of Houston, et al. Other defendants in the case include New Light's pastor, I. V. Hilliard, wife, Bridget Hilliard and daughter, Preshea Hilliard. Price claims she wrote and copyrighted a song called "Women Who Win," which New Light Church and three members of the Hilliard family used without permission in a church show, on DVDs, on a website, and at a "Women Who Win" conference in Houston. The original court docket indicates that the involved parties continued to use the work in a variety of ways despite being refused license to use. Price, however, did not win the case as the court stated she and her legal team failed to state a claim for which relief can be granted. The court also denied Price and her legal team's request to amend the pleadings a second time; it had previously been amended. As such, the court granted the defendants' Motion to Dismiss request.

In 2014, Price left the Los Angeles mansion she had shared and was renting with her now-estranged husband, Jeffrey Rolle, as they were getting a divorce. Months after Price's departure from the home, the landlord subsequently evicted Price's husband and the couple's daughter from the home. The landlord filed a lawsuit against Price and Rolle in early 2015, claiming that the couple had trashed the house and the estimated cost to repair the property was $100,000. In March 2015, the landlord won his case, forcing Price and Rolle to pay over $100,000 in damages and court fees.  

In 2018, Bebashi, a nonprofit HIV/AIDS organization, filed a lawsuit against Price and her company Sang Girl Productions, alleging that Price took $25,000 in advance to perform at a fundraiser that the organization would be hosting. The lawsuit alleges that Price was a no-show and she did not return the $25,000 she had received in advance.

Family 
Price grew up in the Edgemere Projects located in New York City in Far Rockaway, Queens. Her father died when she was nine years old. She  resides in Atlanta, Georgia. Price's grandfather is Jerome Norman, bishop and pastor of the Full Gospel Mission Church of God in Christ in Queens and Jurisdictional Prelate of the First Ecclesiastical Jurisdiction of Barbados since 1985 by the late Presiding Bishop J.O. Patterson. Her mother, Claudia (1951–2020), was the former musical director of the church. Price began singing in church as a youngster.

In 2020, Price lost her grandfather to COVID-19.

Breast cancer activism 
In December 2000, Price donated $250,000 to fight breast cancer. She presented a check to Tony Martell of the T.J. Martell Foundation and Denise Rich of G&P Foundation For Cancer Research to help with the ongoing fight against breast cancer. Price donated the proceeds from her single "Love Sets You Free" which she recorded in January 2000. In April 1999, Price volunteered to showcase her fashion designs during a special charity gala and fashion show to help the National Breast Cancer Awareness Initiative raise money for breast cancer education for minority women. The previous year, in 1998, Price learned that both her mother and her mother-in-law had been diagnosed with breast cancer, which would later claim her mother-in-law's life.

Price's mother was a survivor of inflammatory breast cancer and an activist in educating the public about the disease. She was the chairwoman of the seventh annual Sister to Sister Fitness Festival held in Dallas, Texas which was sponsored by the Celebrating Life Foundation. Claudia experienced pain in her breast in 1997, but said fear and a lack of insurance kept her from seeking immediate medical attention. Instead, she waited two years before seeing a doctor. While at work one day in 1999, her doctor called and said she had inflammatory breast cancer. Doctors gave her two months to live. She underwent chemotherapy, and the disease was in remission as of October 2006.

Discography 

Studio albums
 Soul of a Woman (1998)
 Mirror Mirror (2000)
 One Family: A Christmas Album (2001)
 Priceless (2003)
 This Is Who I Am (2006)
 Kelly (2011)
 Sing Pray Love, Vol. 1: Sing (2014)
 Grace (2021)

Awards and nominations 

AMFT Awards

!Ref.
|-
| rowspan=2|2016
| rowspan=2|"Ultralight Beam" (with Kanye West, Chance the Rapper, Kirk Franklin and The-Dream)
| Best Rap Song
| 
| rowspan=2|
|-
| Best Rap Duo/Group Performance
| 

American Music Award

|-
|2001
|Kelly Price
|Favorite Soul/R&B Female Artist
|
|}

Billboard Music Awards

!Ref.
|-
| 1998
| Kelly Price
| Top Hot R&B Singles Artists – Female
| 
|
|-
| rowspan=3|1999
| rowspan=3|"Heartbreak Hotel" (with Whitney Houston and Faith Evans)
| Top Hot 100 Song
| 
|rowspan=3|
|-
| Top Hot R&B/Hip-Hop Single
| 
|-
| Top Hot R&B/Hip-Hop Single Sales
| 

Grammy Award

|-
|2000
|"Heartbreak Hotel" (with Whitney Houston and Faith Evans)
|Best R&B Performance by a Duo or Group with Vocals
|
|-
|2001
|"As We Lay"
|Best Female R&B Vocal Performance
|
|-
|2004
|"He Proposed"
|Best Traditional R&B Performance
|
|-
|2011
|"Tired"
|Best Female R&B Vocal Performance
|
|-
|rowspan="3"|2012
|rowspan="2"|"Not My Daddy" (feat. Stokley Williams)
|Best R&B Performance
|
|-
|Best R&B Song
|
|-
|Kelly
|Best R&B Album
|
|-
|rowspan="2"|2017
|rowspan="2"|"Ultralight Beam" (with Kanye West, Chance the Rapper, Kirk Franklin and The-Dream)
|Best Rap/Sung Performance
|
|-
|Best Rap Song
|
|}

MTV Video Music Award

|-
|1999
|"Heartbreak Hotel" (with Whitney Houston and Faith Evans)
|Best R&B Video
|
|}

Soul Train Music Award

|-
|rowspan="3"|1999
|Kelly Price
|Best R&B/Soul or Rap New Artist
|
|-
|"Friend of Mine" (feat. R. Kelly and Ronald Isley)
|Best R&B/Soul Single, Female
|
|-
|Soul of a Woman
|Best R&B/Soul Album, Female
|
|-
|2001
|Mirror, Mirror
|Best R&B/Soul Album, Female
|
|}

SoulTracks Readers' Choice Awards

|-
|rowspan="2"|2011
|Kelly Price
|Favorite Female Vocalist of The Year
|
|-
|Kelly
|Indie Album of The Year
|
|}

See also 
List of number-one dance hits (United States)
List of artists who reached number one on the US Dance chart

References

External links 

 
 
 Kelly Price Interview with Benji Irby
 

Living people
African-American women singers
African-American Christians
American dance musicians
American gospel singers
American mezzo-sopranos
American Pentecostals
American soul singers
Def Jam Recordings artists
Members of the Church of God in Christ
People from Far Rockaway, Queens
People from DeKalb County, Georgia
American rhythm and blues singer-songwriters
American contemporary R&B singers
20th-century American women singers
21st-century American women singers
Ballad musicians
21st-century American singers
20th-century American singers
African-American songwriters
1973 births
Singer-songwriters from Georgia (U.S. state)